Oral Ogilvie (born 21 January 1969) is a Canadian athlete. He competed in the men's triple jump at the 1992 Summer Olympics.

References

1969 births
Living people
Athletes (track and field) at the 1992 Summer Olympics
Canadian male triple jumpers
Olympic track and field athletes of Canada
Athletes (track and field) at the 1991 Pan American Games
Pan American Games track and field athletes for Canada
Athletes (track and field) at the 1990 Commonwealth Games
Commonwealth Games competitors for Canada
Jamaican emigrants to Canada